Live from Vatnagarðar is the first live album by the Icelandic alternative folk band Of Monsters and Men, recorded at Studio Sýrland in Vatnagarðar and released digitally through Republic Records worldwide on 20 September 2013. The album consists of six tracks from their previous album—four concert versions, an acoustic version, and a sombre take on their happiest-sounding song—, plus the cover song of their second tour: Yeah Yeah Yeahs' "Skeletons". The first concert performance of this album's version of Little Talks was during the first concert of the band's "May/June North American Tour", at The Orpheum in Vancouver, BC, Canada on 12 May 2013.

Track listing

References

2013 albums
Of Monsters and Men albums